Isopsera is an Asian genus of bush crickets in the subfamily Phaneropterinae.  Species can be found in India, Indochina, Malesia and the Pacific Islands.

Species
The Orthoptera Species File and Catalogue of Life list:
Isopsera arcuata Nagar, Mal & Swaminathan, 2015
Isopsera astyla Karny, 1926
Isopsera bicuspidota Yang & Kang, 1990
Isopsera brevissima Shiraki, 1930
Isopsera caligula Ingrisch, 1990
Isopsera chaseni Karny, 1926
Isopsera denticulata Ebner, 1939
Isopsera fissa Karny, 1931
Isopsera furcocerca Chen & Liu, 1986
Isopsera guangxiensis Yang & Kang, 1990
Isopsera nigroantennata Xia & Liu, 1992
Isopsera obtusa Brunner von Wattenwyl, 1878
Isopsera palauensis Vickery & Kevan, 1999
Isopsera pedunculata Brunner von Wattenwyl, 1878 - type species
Isopsera punctulata Brunner von Wattenwyl, 1891
Isopsera rotundata Karny, 1926
Isopsera scalaris Rehn, 1909
Isopsera spinosa Ingrisch, 1990
Isopsera stylata Brunner von Wattenwyl, 1878
Isopsera sulcata Bey-Bienko, 1955
Isopsera tonkinensis Carl, 1914
Isopsera vaga Brunner von Wattenwyl, 1878
Isopsera yapensis Vickery & Kevan, 1999

References

Tettigoniidae genera
Phaneropterinae
Insects of Asia